The North Branch of the Westfield River (sometimes called the East Branch) starts at the town of Savoy, Massachusetts in the Berkshires.  It flows southeasterly to the town of Cummington where it follows Route 9 to the junction with the Swift River.
Here it turns sharply south and flows through the picturesque Pork Barrel region to West Chesterfield. It continues through a wilderness region to the Knightville Reservoir.  From here it continues south for about 5 miles to Huntington, Massachusetts where it becomes the main branch of the Westfield River. The Middle Branch and the West Branch join it in this section.

External links

Westfield River Watershed Association
American Whitewater description Knightville Section
American Whitewater description Porkbarrel Section

Rivers of Berkshire County, Massachusetts
Rivers of Hampshire County, Massachusetts
Rivers of Massachusetts
Dams in Massachusetts
Wild and Scenic Rivers of the United States